Steven Pressfield (born September 1, 1943) is an American author of historical fiction, non-fiction, and screenplays, including his 1995 novel The Legend of Bagger Vance and 2002 non-fiction book The War of Art.

Early life 
Pressfield was born in Port of Spain, Trinidad, in 1943, while his father was stationed there, in the U.S. Navy.

Education 
Pressfield graduated from Duke University in 1965. In 1966, he joined the U.S. Marine Corps, serving as an infantryman.

Career 
Pressfield was an advertising copywriter, schoolteacher, tractor-trailer driver, bartender, oilfield roustabout, attendant in a mental hospital, fruit-picker in Washington state, and screenwriter. His struggles to make a living as an author, including the period when he was homeless and living out of the back of his car, are detailed in his 2002 book The War of Art.

Pressfield's first book, The Legend of Bagger Vance, which was loosely based on the Bhagavad Gita,  was published in 1995, and was made into a 2000 film of the same name directed by Robert Redford and starring Will Smith, Charlize Theron, and Matt Damon.

His second novel, Gates of Fire (1998), is about the Spartans and the battle at Thermopylae. It is taught at the U.S. Military Academy, the United States Naval Academy, and the Marine Corps Basic School at Quantico.

In 2012, Pressfield launched the publishing house  Black Irish Books with his agent Shawn Coyne.

Works

Fiction
 The Legend of Bagger Vance, about a young man coming to terms with his spiritual demons through the medium of golf (1995). Adapted into the film The Legend of Bagger Vance (2000).
 Gates of Fire, about the Battle of Thermopylae (1998), . The novel is studied at the West Point, the USNA and other military institutions, and topped the list of bestsellers in Greece.
 Tides of War, a novel of Alcibiades and the Peloponnesian War (2000), 
 Last of the Amazons, in which Theseus, the legendary King of Athens, sets sail to the north coast of the Black Sea inhabited by a race of female warriors (2002), 
 The Virtues of War, about Alexander the Great (2004), 
 The Afghan Campaign, about Alexander the Great's conquests in Afghanistan (2006), 
 Killing Rommel (2008), a fictionalized account of a patrol of the British Long Range Desert Group during the North African Campaign of World War II, 
 The Profession (2011), .  Pressfield's first book set in the future, where military force is for hire everywhere. Oil companies, multinational corporations and banks employ powerful, cutting-edge mercenary armies to control global chaos and protect their riches.
36 Righteous Men  (2020), a futuristic noir thriller.
 A Man at Arms (2021), a novel set in Jerusalem and the Sinai desert in the first century AD.

Non-Fiction
 The War of Art: Break Through the Blocks and Win Your Inner Creative Battles (2002), a motivational book that investigates the psychology of creating art and how "writer's block" can be cured.  
 Do The Work (2011), 
 The Warrior Ethos (2011), 
 Turning Pro (2012), 
 The Authentic Swing: Notes from the Writing of First Novel (2013), 
 The Lion's Gate: On the Front Lines of the Six Day War (2014), 
 An American Jew: A Writer Confronts His Own Exile and Identity (2015), 
 Nobody Wants to Read Your Sh*t: Why That Is and What You Can Do About It (2016), 
 The Artist's Journey: The Wake of the Hero's Journey and the Lifelong Pursuit of Meaning (2018),

Filmography 
Prior to publishing his first original works of fiction, Pressfield wrote several Hollywood screenplays including 1986's King Kong Lives, 1988's Above the Law starring Steven Seagal and directed by Andrew Davis, 1992's Freejack, a work of science fiction starring Emilio Estevez, Mick Jagger, and Anthony Hopkins, and 1993's Joshua Tree (a.k.a. Army of One) starring Dolph Lundgren and George Segal. Joshua Tree was directed by Academy Award and Bafta winning stuntman Vic Armstrong.

His novel The Legend of Bagger Vance was made into a 2000 film starring Matt Damon as the golf pro and Will Smith as his spiritual guide and was widely criticized for its use of the "Magical Negro" as a plot device.

Pressfield also appeared as one of the historians in The History Channel's 2007 documentary Last Stand of the 300 and a commentator on an episode of the History Channel's Decisive Battles series featuring Alexander the Great on July 30, 2004.

References

Additional sources 
 Pressfield, Steven. (2012 ed.). War of Art. New York/Los Angeles: Black Irish Books. 
 Pressfield, Steven. (2012 ed.). Turning Pro. New York/Los Angeles: Black Irish Books.

External links 

 Steven Pressfield Official Website
 
 
 Steven Pressfield leads discussion about The Creative Battleground as guest host of LitChat
 Steven Pressfield's "Writing Wednesdays" series
 New York Times Blog "At War" features article about Steven Pressfield's blog and the "One Tribe At A Time" paper, by Major Jim Gant

1943 births
20th-century American novelists
21st-century American novelists
American male novelists
United States Marines
American military writers
American historical novelists
Writers of historical fiction set in antiquity
Living people
Duke University alumni
20th-century American male writers
21st-century American male writers
20th-century American non-fiction writers
21st-century American non-fiction writers
American male non-fiction writers
Jewish American writers